The High Sheriff of County Waterford was the Sovereign's judicial representative in County Waterford. Initially, an office for a lifetime, assigned by the Sovereign, the High Sheriff became an annual appointment following the Provisions of Oxford in 1258. Besides his judicial importance, the sheriff had ceremonial and administrative functions and executed High Court Writs. 

The first High Sheriff of County Waterford whose name is known for certain seems to be Maurice de Porta in 1235; Sir William de la Rochelle was High Sheriff in 1262-3, and William of London in 1270-3. Probably the most powerful of the early Sheriffs was Sir Walter de la Haye, a highly regarded Crown administrator and later a judge, who held office from 1272 to 1284. Unusually, instead of stepping down after a year, De la Haye's term in office continued year after year for more than a decade. He was then appointed Chief Escheator in 1285, and was briefly Justiciar of Ireland in 1294-6. 

The first (High) Shrievalties were established before the Norman Conquest in 1066 and date back to Saxon times. In 1908, an Order in Council made the Lord-Lieutenant the Sovereign's prime representative in a county and reduced the High Sheriff's precedence. Despite that, however, the office retained his responsibilities for the preservation of law and order in a county.

High Sheriffs of County Waterford
1235-1236: Maurice de Porta
1262-1263: Sir William de la Rochelle
1270-1271: William of London 
1272-1284: Sir Walter de la Haye
1390: Peter  Poer 
1408: John  Lyverpole
1414: Nicholas Walshe
1424: Nicholas Poer
1535: Sir Richard Poer
1607: Laurence Esmonde, 1st Baron Esmonde of Lymbricke
1613: Sir Richard Smyth of Ballynatray
1639: Edward Fitzgerald
1644: Andrew Lynn 
1663: Valentine Greatrakes
1666: Richard Moore of Clonwel
1670: John Nettles of Toureen
1671: Sir Richard Osborne, 2nd Baronet
1672: Sir Thomas Osborne, 5th Baronet
1673:
1678: Thomas Christmas 
1676: Richard Christmas 
1687: Richard Fitzgerald
1689: John Hore
1690: Benjamin Bolton
1691:

18th century

19th century

20th century
1900: Lucien William Bonaparte Wyse of the Manor of St Johns.
1901: Richard John Ussher of Cappagh House.
1902: John Henry Graham Holroyd Smyth  
1903:
1905: William Joseph Gallwey of Rockfield, Tramore.
1906: John Congreve of Mount Congreve.
1907: Henry Chavasse. 
1908: William Moore Perceval-Maxwell of Moore Hill, Tallow.
1909: Hon. Claud Anson.
1909: Robert Conway Dobbs Dobbs.
1910: James Grove White of Kilbyrne.
1911: Sir John Keane, 5th Baronet.
1913: John William Rivallon de la Poher Poer, 2nd (papal) Count de la Poer.
1914: Sir Herbert William Davis-Goff, 2nd Baronet.
1915:
1919: Sir Alexander Kay Muir, 2nd Baronet.

References

High Sheriffs of County Waterford
Waterford
History of County Waterford